Xinhe station, is a station of Line 14 of the Guangzhou Metro. It started operations on 28 December 2017.

Station layout

Exits
There are 3 exits, lettered A, B and C. Exits A and C are accessible. All exits are located on Guangcong No. 9 Road.

References

Railway stations in China opened in 2017
Guangzhou Metro stations in Baiyun District